William McPherson (July 2, 1864 – October 2, 1951) was the acting President of Ohio State University from July 1, 1938, to March 1, 1940. A chemistry laboratory at Ohio State is named for him.

Further reading
Past Presidents of the Ohio State University
McPherson Hall at The Ohio State University

External links
 
 

Presidents of Ohio State University
1864 births
1951 deaths